Santa Pau is a village and municipality in the province of Girona and autonomous community of Catalonia, Spain.

References

External links
 Government data pages 

Municipalities in Garrotxa